Victoria Palacios Carillo (born March 29, 1977 in Hueyotlipan, Tlaxcala) is a retired female race walker from Mexico.

Achievements

References

sports-reference

1977 births
Living people
Mexican female racewalkers
Athletes (track and field) at the 2003 Pan American Games
Athletes (track and field) at the 2004 Summer Olympics
Olympic athletes of Mexico
Pan American Games medalists in athletics (track and field)
Pan American Games gold medalists for Mexico
Central American and Caribbean Games gold medalists for Mexico
Competitors at the 2002 Central American and Caribbean Games
Central American and Caribbean Games medalists in athletics
Medalists at the 2003 Pan American Games
21st-century Mexican women